Amazônia Legal, also known as Brazil's Legal Amazon (BLA), is the largest socio-geographic division in Brazil, containing all nine states in the Amazon basin. The government designated this region in 1948 based on its studies on how to plan the economic and social development of the Amazon region.

Area 
The official designation Amazônia Legal encompasses all seven states of the North Region (Acre, Amapá, Amazonas, Pará, Rondônia, Roraima and Tocantins), as well as most of Mato Grosso in the Center-West Region and the western part of Maranhão in the Northeast Region. Amazônia Legal is a 5,016,136.3 km2 region with around 24 million inhabitants; in other words 59% of the geographic territory of Brazil is part of Amazônia Legal, but only 12.34% of the Brazilian population lives there. The administrative unit was initially established by Federal Law No. 5.173 (Art. 2).  

Although called Amazônia Legal, the region overlaps three different biomes: all of Brazil's Amazon biome, 37% of the Cerrado biome, and 40% of the Pantanal biome. The main characteristic of the region is the abundant and tropical vegetation, including large sections of rainforest.

Amazônia Ocidental comprises the states of: Acre, Amazonas, Roraima and Rondônia.

Demographics 
A total population of 24.7 million inhabitants lives in the area, 
including more than 300,000 indigenous people belonging to more than 170 ethnicities. Among these are many traditional extractive communities.

Because of its remoteness, this region was the last to be colonized by Brazilians of European descent. It still has a very low population density.

See also
 Brazilian Institute of Environment and Renewable Natural Resources
 Brazil socio-geographic division
 Centro-Sul
 Nordeste
 Deforestation in Brazil
 Pantanal jaguar
 Regions of Brazil

References

External links
 The various Amazons - Instituto Sociambiental
 Amazônia Legal, on Noticias Da Amazonia (in Portuguese)
 Bolsa Floresta

Demographics of Brazil
North Region, Brazil
Amazon basin
Central-West Region, Brazil